Flute, viola and harp are the instruments of a chamber music ensemble that has become common through the establishment of standard repertoire featuring this instrumentation. Claude Debussy is often credited with writing the first piece of music for this ensemble, his Sonata for Flute, Viola and Harp, L. 137 (1915); however, though that is a famous piece for the ensemble, the earliest known work composed for this trio of instruments is the Terzettino by Théodore Dubois (1905). Since its establishment as a trio in the early twentieth century, numerous composers worldwide have written works for the ensemble. The trio has gained popularity partly due to its unique timbre: with its arco (bowed) and pizzicato abilities, the viola bridges the gap between the smooth flute sound and plucked harp tones.

Early works for flute, viola and harp 
The earliest two works composed for flute, viola, and harp are Théodore Dubois's Terzettino (1905) and Claude Debussy's Sonata for Flute, Viola and Harp (1915). The Terzettino is a relatively short work in one movement lasting approximately five minutes, and its main theme is a lyrical, romantic-style melody. Considered to be a beautiful work because of its simplicity and elegant style, the Terzettino is sometimes programmed alongside Debussy's trio to showcase the contrast between the two. Written ten years after the Terzettino, Debussy's famous sonata for these instruments is a multi-movement work that explores less-traditional tonalities and a wider range of emotions through its ethereal, transparent sound and careful interplay between the instrumental voices. Originally composed for flute, oboe, and harp, Debussy changed the planned instrumentation of his trio to make use of the viola's more flexible timbre that unifies the harp and flute sounds. Debussy's trio for flute, viola and harp is known a staple for the ensemble and the model that inspired other composers to write for the same instrumentation. Both of these early works for flute, viola and harp demonstrate the ensemble's unique sound, paving the way for numerous trios by various composers in the twentieth and twenty-first centuries.

List of flute, viola and harp groups

 Auréole (United States)
 Aurora Trio (United Kingdom)
 Auros Trio (Germany)
 Beau Soir Ensemble (Washington, D.C.)
 Bohemia Luxembourg Trio (Luxembourg)
 Cosmos Trio (United States)
 Debussy Trio (United States) 
 Debussy Ensemble (United Kingdom)
 Deciduous Trio (United States) 
 ensemble infini (Japan)
 Ensemble Transparent (Finland)
 Fire Pink Trio (United States) 
 Formosa Trio (Indiana, USA)
 Giverny Trio (New Zealand)
 janus trio (Brooklyn, NY)
 La Mer Trio (United Kingdom) 
 Lorien Trio (Poland)
 Los Angeles Harp Trio (United States) 
 Mauris Ensemble (Poland)
 Midnight Rose Trio (United States)
 MirAnDa Trio (Netherlands) 
 Myriad Trio (United States)
 Naiades Ensemble (United Kingdom)
 New York Harp Trio (United States)
 Pelléas Ensemble (United Kingdom)
 Trilogy Ensemble (United Kingdom) 
 Trio Alexander (United States)
 Trio Anima (Great Britain) 
 Trio Arcane (Switzerland)
 Trio Charolca (Germany)
 Trio Beau Soir (Québec, Canada) 
 Trio BECEL (Belgium)
 Trio Lyra (Canada)
 Trio Mallarmé (Germany)
 Trio Medicis (Belgium)
 Trio Momentum (Germany, Italy, Japan)
 Trio Notturno (United States)
 Trio Sospiroso (United Kingdom)
 Trio Spiritus (France)
 Trio Verlaine (Canada)
 Triolet (Italy)
 Turner Trio (France)

Selected works for flute, viola and harp
For standard flute, viola and harp unless otherwise noted

See also
 Chamber music

External links

References 

Chamber music
 
 
 
Flute
Types of musical groups